Ranunculus arvensis, the corn buttercup or field buttercup, is a plant species in the family Ranunculaceae. Native to Europe, it can be found on other continents as an introduced species and sometimes a weed, including in North America and Australia. It was formerly a common annual arable weed in Britain, but is now rare there. It is most often found in moist places, such as spring puddles in meadows.

Many local common names refer to the spines on the seed heads or the achenes on the mature fruit:

devil's claws
hellweed
devil-on-both-sides
devil's coach wheel
devil's currycombs
crowclaws (Yorkshire)
horse-gold (Yorkshire)
eggs-and-bacon (Cheshire)
jackweed (Oxfordshire)

References

External links
 
 Jepson Manual Treatment
 Washington Burke Museum
 Photo gallery

arvensis
Flora of Europe
Flora of England
Plants described in 1753
Taxa named by Carl Linnaeus